Abraham's Gold is a 1990 German drama film directed by Jörg Graser. It was screened in the Un Certain Regard section at the 1990 Cannes Film Festival.

Cast
 Hanna Schygulla – Barbara "Bärbel" Hunzinger
  – Karl Lechner
 Daniela Schötz – Annamirl Hunzinger
  – Huntziger
  – Lechnerin
  – Probst, Bürgermeister
 Otto Tausig – Pfarrer
  – Polizist
  – Polizist
  – Verkäuferin
  – Köchin
 Toni Gierl – Köchin

References

External links
 

1990 films
1990 drama films
1990s German-language films
Films directed by Jörg Graser
Films about the aftermath of the Holocaust
German drama films
1990s German films